Paul Kohler (born 5 August 1979) is an Australian professional footballer of German and Italian origin.

Career
In February 2005, Kohler signed with Newcastle Jets to play in the newly formed A-League.

Kohler rejoined Sutherland Sharks in May 2010. He moved to Rockdale City Suns for the next season.

Honours

Club
Sydney Olympic:
 NSL Championship: 2001-2002

Newcastle Jets:
 A-League Championship: 2007-2008

References

External links
 North Queensland Fury profile
 Oz Football profile

1979 births
Living people
Soccer players from Sydney
Australian people of German descent
Association football central defenders
A-League Men players
National Soccer League (Australia) players
Newcastle Jets FC players
Northern Fury FC players
Sydney Olympic FC players
Australian soccer players